Bjerknes is a lunar impact crater that is located in the southern hemisphere on the rugged far side of the Moon. The crater lies behind the southeastern limb, and beyond the region that is sometimes brought into sight through libration. Thus this crater can not be viewed from Earth, and has only been seen from orbit. Nearby named craters are Clark to the east, and Pogson to the south-southwest.

The crater rim is generally circular, but with some slight irregularities along the northeastern quadrant. The rim is relatively sharp-edged, and displays little appearance of wear. The interior floor is rough and irregular, beginning with the slumped material at the base of the inner walls.

The crater is named in honor of Vilhelm Bjerknes, a pioneer in the field of weather forecasting.

Satellite craters
By convention these features are identified on lunar maps by placing the letter on the side of the crater midpoint that is closest to Bjerknes.

References

 
 
 
 
 
 
 
 
 
 
 
 

Impact craters on the Moon